Miami Love Affair is a 2017 American romantic comedy film written and directed by Ralph Kinnard and starring Burt Reynolds in one of his final film roles.

Plot
It is about several love affairs at an international art fair in Miami. Lucia, an artist from Latin America, meets Benedict. Victor, a writer travels to Miami with his girlfriend Ana. While Ana is more in love with money and her job, Victor then spends time with Nina. Theo, Nina's boyfriend, woes a rich old lady to commission hundreds of paintings from him, but the rich old lady wants something in return.

Cast
Burt Reynolds as Robert
Mónica Pasqualotto as Lucia
Ralph Kinnard as Benedict
Anisbel Lopez as Nina
Alan Klinger as Victor
Rusbeh Bani as Theo
Ana Lucia Chaverria as Anna

References

External links
 Miami Love Affair at filmaffinity.com
 
 

American romantic comedy films
2017 romantic comedy films
2017 comedy films
2010s English-language films
2010s American films